The Sri Lanka Labour Party is a political party which is led by A.S.P.Liyanage. The secretary is Miss P.D.K.K.P.Liyanage. The official logo is a kangaroo.

References

Nationalist parties in Sri Lanka
Political parties in Sri Lanka